Ivan Markovic (born 15 June 1997) is a Swiss footballer who plays for FC Hünibach. Markovic is of Croatian descent.

References

External links

Swiss men's footballers
Swiss people of Croatian descent
Swiss Super League players
1997 births
Living people
FC Thun players
FC Naters players
Association football forwards